Richard Walton Tully (May 7, 1877 – February 1, 1945) was an American playwright.

Biography
Tully was born on May 7, 1877, in Nevada City, California. Tully was married to another playwright Eleanor Gates until he divorced her in 1914.

His best known work was the 1912 play The Bird of Paradise, which caused a long-running court case over alleged plagiarism. A schoolteacher named Grace Fender was initially successful in persuading the court that Tully's play was based on her play In Hawaii, however the case was reversed on appeal.

Tully retired to breed horses. He died on February 1, 1945, in New York City at the Columbia-Presbyterian Medical Center.

Filmography
Rose of the Rancho, directed by Cecil B. DeMille (1914, based on the play Rose of the Rancho)
Omar the Tentmaker, directed by James Young (1922, based on the play Omar the Tentmaker)
Bird of Paradise, directed by King Vidor (1932, based on the play The Bird of Paradise)
Rose of the Rancho, directed by Marion Gering (1936, based on the play Rose of the Rancho)
Bird of Paradise, directed by Delmer Daves (1951, based on the play The Bird of Paradise)

Screenwriter
The Masquerader, directed by James Young (1922)
Trilby, directed by James Young (1923)
 Flowing Gold, directed by Joseph De Grasse (1924)

References

External links

 
 
 

1877 births
1945 deaths
20th-century American dramatists and playwrights
20th-century American male writers
American male dramatists and playwrights
People from Nevada City, California